Cilcain is a village and community, near Mold in Flintshire, north-east Wales. The village has an industrial history and includes the Millennium Woods, a post office, a public house, a parish church, a primary school (Ysgol y Foel) and a village hall. It's most known for its famous mountain Moel Famau.

Cilcain borders the parishes of Rhosesmor, Rhes-y-cae and Rhydymwyn.

The community includes the village of Rhydymwyn.

Name
The Welsh placename Cilcain, which has also in the past been spelled as Kilken and Cilcen, has been suggested to derive from cil meaning 'retreat' and cain meaning 'fair' or 'pleasant' in the Welsh language.

Early Cilcain
In the early years of Cilcain's existence it was noted as a place of retreat and was also locally famous for its regular village fairs, where a notable amount of alcohol was often consumed. Cilcain was also known for cockfighting, which took place on Sundays after the local church service.

Church

The first recorded mention of the church at Cilcain dates from 1291. Cilcain is one of the "ancient parishes" of Flintshire. It originally comprised the seven townships of Cefn, Llan (or Tre'r Llan), Llystynhunydd (or Glust), Llys y Coed, Maes y Groes, Mechlas (or Dolfechlas), and Trellyniau.
On 27 June 1848, the township of Trellyniau and part of the township of Llystynhunydd went to the new parish of Rhes-y-Cae. On 31 March 1865, the remainder of Llystynhunydd, and parts of the townships of Cefn and Mechlas, went to the new parish of Rhydymwyn.

Governance
An electoral ward in the same name exists. This ward stretches north and had a total population at the 2011 Census of 1,874.

Millennium Woods
The Millennium Woods were planted in 2000 through the 'Woods on your doorstep' scheme of the Woodland Trust. Many of the trees were planted by some of the students attending the local school, Ysgol y Foel, in that year. The official name is Coed y Felin ('Mill Woods'), named after the disused mill that now lies in ruins by the stream below.

See also
Cilcain Hall
Brynle Williams (1949–2011), Cilcain farmer and Conservative member of the National Assembly for Wales.
Cilcain Village Hall - news and events
Cilcain Community Shop

References

External links

Cilcain Community Council
Cilcain Village Hall
Cilcain Community Shop
Siop Gymunedol Cilcain
Cilcain Today
Cilcain & Nannerch website
Photos of Cilcain and surrounding area on geograph.org.uk

Villages in Flintshire
Communities in Flintshire